Pilcaniyeu is a department of the province of Río Negro (Argentina).

Municipalities
Ñirihuau

References 

Departments of Río Negro Province